Shadows and Sunshine is a 1916 American silent drama film directed by Henry King and starring Marie Osborne, Leon Pardue, and Lucy Payton.

Cast
 Marie Osborne as Little Mary 
 Leon Pardue as Shadows 
 Lucy Payton as Little Mary's Mother 
 Daniel Gilfether as Gilbert Jackson 
 Mollie McConnell as Amelia Jackson 
 R. Henry Grey as Undetermined Role 
 Henry King as Undetermined Role

References

Bibliography
 Donald W. McCaffrey & Christopher P. Jacobs. Guide to the Silent Years of American Cinema. Greenwood Publishing, 1999.

External links

1916 films
1916 drama films
Silent American drama films
Films directed by Henry King
American silent feature films
1910s English-language films
American black-and-white films
Pathé Exchange films
1910s American films